Stenidea nemorensis is a species of beetle in the family Cerambycidae. It was described by Thomson in 1860, originally under the genus Amblesthis.

References

nemorensis
Beetles described in 1860